Mirza Farhatullah Baig (1885–1947) was an Indian Urdu writer of humor and prose,  and a senior judge in Hyderabad State.

References

External links
Islamic scholars

Poets from Delhi
Urdu-language poets from India
Indian Muslims
People from Aligarh
Writers in British India
Indian male poets
1880s births
1947 deaths
Urdu-language translators
20th-century Indian poets
20th-century Indian male writers